The 1992 United States presidential election in Kentucky took place on November 3, 1992, as part of the 1992 United States presidential election. As of the result of the 1990 census, Kentucky lost an electoral vote. Voters chose eight representatives, or electors to the Electoral College, who voted for president and vice president.

Kentucky was won by Governor Bill Clinton (D-Arkansas) with 44.55 percent of the popular vote over incumbent President George H. W. Bush (R-Texas) with 41.34 percent, a margin of 3.21%. Businessman Ross Perot (I-Texas) finished in third, with 13.66 percent of the popular vote. Clinton ultimately won the national vote, defeating incumbent President Bush and Perot.

This is the last election in which LaRue County, Daviess County, Bullitt County, Barren County, Breckinridge County, Hart County, Spencer County, Mason County, Fleming County, Todd County, Owen County, Metcalfe County, Crittenden County, Bracken County, and Robertson County voted for a Democratic presidential candidate, as well as the last time Kentucky voted to the left of Arizona, Florida, Nevada, New Hampshire, New Jersey, or neighboring Ohio.

Results

Results by county

References

Kentucky
1992
1992 Kentucky elections